Kopyonkina is a rural locality (a settlement) and the administrative center of Kopenkinskoye Rural Settlement, Rossoshansky District, Voronezh Oblast, Russia. The population was 601 as of 2010. There are 9 streets.

Geography 
Kopyonkina is located 24 km south of Rossosh (the district's administrative centre) by road. Voroshilovsky is the nearest rural locality.

References 

Rural localities in Rossoshansky District